Mobile Operating System (MOS) is an operating system, a Soviet clone of Unix from the 1980s.

Overview
This operating system is commonly found on SM EVM minicomputers; it was also ported to ES EVM and Elbrus. MOS is also used by high-end PDP-11 clones.

Modifications of MOS include MNOS, DEMOS, etc.

See also
 List of Soviet computer systems

References

Unix variants
Computing in the Soviet Union